Noterus is a genus of beetle native to the Palearctic (including Europe), the Near East and North Africa. It contains the following species:

 Noterus angustulus Zaitzev, 1953
 Noterus clavicornis (De Geer, 1774)
 Noterus crassicornis (O.F.Müller, 1776)
 Noterus granulatus Régimbart, 1883
 Noterus japonicus Sharp, 1873
 Noterus laevis Sturm, 1834
 Noterus ponticus Sharp, 1882

References

External links
 Noterus at Fauna Europaea
 
 

Noteridae
Adephaga genera